The Halmahera swiftlet or Moluccan swiftlet (Aerodramus infuscatus, formerly Collocalia infuscata) is a species in the family Apodidae. It is endemic to Halmahera.

Its natural habitats are subtropical or tropical moist lowland forests and subtropical or tropical moist montane forests. The IUCN lumps the Halmahera swiftlet, the Sulawesi swiftlet, and the Seram swiftlet together, calling it the Moluccan swiftlet.

References

Rheindt, F.E., and R.O. Hutchinson. 2007. A photoshot odyssey through the confused avian taxonomy of Seram and Buru (southern Moluccas). BirdingASIA 7: 18–38.

Halmahera swiftlet
Birds of Halmahera
Halmahera swiftlet